The Solihull Metropolitan Borough Council elections were held on Thursday, 7 May 1992, with one third of the council to be elected. The council remained under no overall control with the Conservatives three seats short of a majority. Voter turnout was 37.8%.

Election result

|- style="background-color:#F9F9F9"
! style="background-color: " |
| Independent Ratepayers & Residents 
| align="right" | 2
| align="right" | 0
| align="right" | 0
| align="right" | 0
| align="right" | 11.8
| align="right" | 8.8
| align="right" | 5,187
| align="right" | +0.5%
|-

This result had the following consequences for the total number of seats on the council after the elections:

Ward results

|- style="background-color:#F6F6F6"
! style="background-color: " |
| colspan="2"   | Independent Ratepayers hold 
| align="right" | Swing
| align="right" | +3.7
|-

References

1992 English local elections
1992
1990s in the West Midlands (county)